Carrozzeria Motto was an Italian (Turin) coachbuilding company established in 1932 by Rocco Motto. The company produced bodies from Cadillacs to Delahayes. In 1946 Motto commenced building aluminium bodies for Alfa Romeo, Fiat, Cisitalia, Bandini and Ermini. During 1963, Motto made a body for a Franco Scaglione-designed Porsche-Abarth 356 Carrera GTL berlinetta. He also bodied a handful of Ferraris.

References

External links
 Coachbuild.com Encyclopedia: Motto

Coachbuilders of Italy
Manufacturing companies based in Turin
Vehicle manufacturing companies established in 1930